Branchiostegus vittatus is a species of marine ray-finned fish, a tilefish belonging to the family Malacanthidae. It is found around Manila in the Philippines.

References

Malacanthidae
Taxa named by Albert William Herre
Fish described in 1926